Frédéric Chopin's Rondo à la Krakowiak in F major, Op. 14 is a composition for piano and orchestra. It was written in 1828 and dedicated to Princess Anna Zofia Sapieha, whose mother, Izabela Czartoryska, was influential in shaping the burgeoning Romantic aesthetic in Poland, particularly through the Temple of [Polish] Memory in Puławy.

The Rondo à la Krakowiak was written in Warsaw in 1828 under the guidance of Józef Elsner. It has received a number of recordings but still remains less known than most of Chopin's other works.

Structure 

The piece begins with a soft, pentatonic section in 3/4 time, which introduces the lively syncopated krakowiak in its typical 2/4 meter.

Chopin quotes Niccolò Paganini's Caprice No. 24 during this work, and includes a variation on the quotation.

External links 
 

Concertante works by Frédéric Chopin
1828 compositions
Compositions in F major
Music with dedications